MHz Legacy is the first studio album by American hip hop group MHz Legacy. It was released on Man Bites Dog Records on October 30, 2012. It features guest appearances from Danny Brown, Ill Bill, Slaine, and Slug. Production is handled by the likes of Harry Fraud, Marco Polo, and J. Rawls.

Music videos were created for "Gone", "Somewhere", "Obituaries", "Outta Room", and "Satisfaction".

Critical reception

At Metacritic, which assigns a weighted average score out of 100 to reviews from mainstream critics, the album received an average score of 81, based on 4 reviews, indicating "universal acclaim".

Andres Tardio of HipHopDX wrote, "For now, MHz Legacy fits the group's journey quite well with strong highlights and a few struggles along the way." Nick McClure of Okayplayer stated, "Fans of quick-witted wordplay and hard beats will not be disappointed, even if they did wait a decade." Bogar Alonso of XXL commented that the album "sounds like the perfect counterbalance to the grit of Cannibal Ox's The Cold Vein (though with a few less gradients of genius)."

Track listing

References

External links
 

2012 debut albums
Hip hop albums by American artists
Albums produced by RJD2
Albums produced by Harry Fraud
Albums produced by Illmind
Albums produced by Marco Polo
Albums produced by J. Rawls